The Virginia EP is an EP and compilation album by American indie rock band The National, released on May 20, 2008 on Beggars Banquet Records. The release includes B-sides, demo recordings and live recordings relating to the band's fourth studio album, Boxer (2007). The CD version of the release includes a DVD featuring the documentary film A Skin, A Night by filmmaker Vincent Moon.  A vinyl edition of The Virginia EP was issued in January, 2013.

Track listing

Personnel

The National
Matt Berninger
Aaron Dessner
Bryce Dessner
Scott Devendorf
Bryan Devendorf

Additional musicians
Sufjan Stevens (1)
Marla Hansen (2)
Carin Besser – vocals (7)
Marc Meeuwissen – trombone (11 and 12)
Tom Verschooren – trombone (11 and 12)
John Birdsong – cornet (11 and 12)

Recording personnel
Peter Katis – recording and mixing (1, 2, 3, 4 and 7)
Brandon Reid – vocal recording (1, 2, 3 and 4)
Bennett Paster – piano recording  (1, 2, 3 and 4)
Oliver Straus – recording and mixing (5)
Aaron Dessner – recording (6 and 8)
Bryce Dessner – recording (6)
Patrick Stolley – sound engineering (9)
Ed Haber – recording (10)
Adam Goldfried – mixing (10)
David Spelman – mixing (10)
Stef Van Alsenoy – recording (11 and 12)
Joel Hamburger – mixing (11 and 12)
Noah Mintz – mastering

Artwork
Vincent Moon – photography

References

2008 EPs
The National (band) albums
B-side compilation albums
2008 compilation albums